Hit Squad is a 1976 Italian "poliziottesco"-comedy film directed by Bruno Corbucci. It is the second chapter in the Nico Giraldi film series starred by Tomas Milian.

Plot 
In the anti-theft team, Giraldi Marshal deals with criminals who commit thefts in apartments or steal cars. Among these is a band to which it belongs Blinds, a little thief inclined to confess things, Zagaja, a stutterer thief, and the Sicilians Rosario and Salvatore Trapani. Performed the theft in the villa of an American (former CIA), the thieves come into possession of documents about a system of bribes concerning some important personalities in the United States, the Deal Zebra Point.

Having become in contact with emissaries of the US Ralf Douglas Blinds requires a sum of money for the return of the booklet: is killed. The murder of Zagaja puts Giraldi Marshal in alarm, which senses that Douglas had been robbed of something important: to ascertain what are stalked the Trapanese brothers who have since been in touch with the Douglas emissaries. The attempt failed and the two thieves are killed, but an emissary of Douglas leaves a trace: thanks to that Giraldi flies to New York where, tracked down Douglas, has him arrested.

Cast 
Tomas Milian: Nico Giraldi
Robert Webber: Mr. Douglas
Lilli Carati: Vanessa
Giuseppe Pambieri: Tapparella
Giuliana Calandra: Lt. Ciampini
Toni Ucci: Filotto
Olimpia Di Nardo: Olimpia Trippetta
Massimo Vanni: Gargiulo
John P. Dulaney: Ballarin
Vittorio Stagni: Er Zagaja
Enzo Pulcrano: Salvatore Trapanese 
Benito Stefanelli: Avv. Gorniani 
Bombolo: Er Trippa
Mimmo Poli: Vittorio Raganelli (Il Musulmano)
Giancarlo Badessi: Maniac 
Anna Bonaiuto: Cameriera 
Tony Morgan: Gnappetta
Nello Pazzafini: Capitano della nave

Release
Hit Squad was released on October 29, 1976 in Italy where it was distributed by Titanus. The film grossed a total of 1,825,316,810 Italian lire on its theatrical release.

See also 
 List of Italian films of 1976

Notes

Bibliography

External links

1976 films
Films directed by Bruno Corbucci
Italian comedy films
Poliziotteschi films
Films set in Rome
Films scored by Guido & Maurizio De Angelis
1970s crime comedy films
1976 comedy films
1970s Italian films